Post was transported over water in the United States in the later nineteenth and the twentieth century.

Origins 
Route agents and, later, railway post office (RPO) clerks were placed on inland boat lines at a very early date; postmarks go back to 1857.  By the 1890s the river packets and steamers on the Ohio and Mississippi rivers usually carried RPO mail units, such as the old Cairo & Memphis, and the Vicksburg & New Orleans. Many lakes had this service. In 1902, 82 clerks were serving on 49 boat routes. The last year-round service of this type was in the state of Washington, where the Bellingham & Anacortes lasted until 1950.

The longest Boat RPOs operated between New York and San Juan, Puerto Rico, New York and the Canal Zone, plus several routes from Seattle, Washington to Alaska ports. These were discontinued at the onset of World War II.

Last services 
Two boat RPOs outlived their railway route counterparts. The last rail route made its final trip between New York and Washington, D.C. on June 30, 1977. The Wolfboro & Merrymount RPO lost its Boat RPO status upon its last trip of the season on Lake Winnipesaukee on September 15, 1978. The title "RPO" was completely erased when the New Hampshire RPO closed its operating season on September 30, 1978. These two boat routes still carry mail and operate as water-borne rural free delivery routes, but no longer have their distinctive RPO postmark.

See also

References 
 Wilking, Clarence (1985). The Railway Mail Service, Railway Mail Service Library, Boyce, Virginia .  Available as an MS Word file at http://www.railwaymailservicelibrary.org/articles/THE_RMS.DOC.

Postal vehicles
United States Postal Service